Kateřina Zohnová (born 7 November 1984) is a Czech female basketball player. At the 2012 Summer Olympics, she competed for the Czech Republic women's national basketball team in the women's event. She is 5 ft 10 inches tall.

References

External links

Czech women's basketball players
1984 births
Living people
Olympic basketball players of the Czech Republic
Basketball players at the 2012 Summer Olympics
People from Kraslice
Sportspeople from the Karlovy Vary Region